Armadillo Technical Institute (ATI) is a small public charter school in Phoenix, Oregon, United States. It enrolled 110 students in grades 912 and provides a GED preparation program as of 2020. Its director is Summer Brandon.

ATI opened in 2000 with the mission to help students who needed an alternative to traditional high school and flexible paths to high school completion. In the 2018–19 school year the school brought back its GED Program. ATI's diploma seeking program specializes in helping students graduate early or rapidly recover credit. Graduation rates increased 20% in the 2019-2020 school year

Academics
Armadillo Technical Institute is an accredited high school through Cognia, which allows the school to award credit and all types of Oregon Diplomas. They offer all credit types and courses required for graduation in the state of Oregon, and ATI is adept at helpings students earn credit through proficiency, work experience, and the pursuit of individual interests through Independent Projects.  ATI staff utilize trauma informed practices to help students engage in standards based learning and build new academic and life skills.  As reported by the Oregon Department of Education, 44% of ATI seniors graduated with an Oregon Diploma, while another 42% "completed" high school with either a diploma after their 4th year of high school or a GED.

Culture 
Armadillo Technical Institute is known for its small school setting and welcoming culture. Focus is given to community building, social-emotional growth, and interpersonal skills. Students have access to a full time mental health professional, laundry and self-care facilities, a school based health clinic, breakfast and lunch meals provided, college and career counseling and support, and a school community that is dedicated to their success.

References

High schools in Jackson County, Oregon
Alternative schools in Oregon
Public high schools in Oregon
Public middle schools in Oregon
Phoenix, Oregon
Charter schools in Oregon